|}

The Prix du Gros Chêne is a Group 2 flat horse race in France open to thoroughbreds aged three years or older. It is run at Chantilly over a distance of 1,000 metres (about 5 furlongs), and it is scheduled to take place each year in late May or early June.

History
The event was established in 1857, and it was originally contested over 800 metres. Its title refers to a large oak tree which stood in the grounds of the racecourse – the English translation of Gros Chêne is "Great Oak". The race was abandoned because of the Franco-Prussian War in 1871. It was extended to 1,000 metres in 1881.

The Prix du Gros Chêne was cancelled throughout World War I, with no running from 1915 to 1918. The first two post-war editions were run over 1,100 metres at Longchamp.

The race was abandoned once during World War II, in 1940. It was staged at Maisons-Laffitte from 1941 to 1943, and at Auteuil with a distance of 900 metres in 1944. It returned to Maisons-Laffitte in 1945, and it was transferred to Longchamp in 1946. Five successive runnings during the wartime period were won by one horse, Fine Art. The race returned to its original venue, Chantilly, in 1957.

The present system of race grading was introduced in 1971, and for a period the Prix du Gros Chêne held Group 3 status. It was promoted to Group 2 level in 1988. The race is now held on the same day as the Prix du Jockey Club.

Records
Most successful horse (5 wins):
 Fine Art – 1942, 1943, 1944, 1945, 1946

Leading jockey (9 wins):
 Roger Poincelet – Fine Art (1944, 1945, 1946), Kalpack (1954), Palariva (1956), Jini (1957), Sly Pola (1960), High Bulk (1961), L'Epinay (1963)

Leading trainer (7 wins):
 François Mathet – Joshua (1953), Edellic (1958, 1959), Texanita (1964), Farhana (1967), Rockcress (1969), Adraan (1980)
 Robert Collet - Kind Music (1982), Last Tycoon (1986), Sainte Marine (1988, 1989), Beauty Is Truth (2007), Wizz Kid (2011, 2012)

Leading owner (5 wins):
 Claude-Joachim Lefèvre – Alaric (1872), Regane (1873), Octave (1883), Feuillage (1886), Frapotel (1888)
 Pierre Wertheimer – Epinard (1923), La Fayette (1929), Quartz (1933), Sanguine (1951), Kalpack (1954)
 Louis de La Rochette – Fine Art (1942, 1943, 1944, 1945, 1946)

Winners since 1980

Earlier winners

 1857: Brassia
 1858:
 1859: Phenix
 1860: Geologie
 1861:
 1862: Sauterelle
 1863: Gentilhomme
 1864: Partisan
 1865:
 1866: Anglo Saxon
 1867: Czar
 1868: Dragon
 1869: Turco
 1870: Manette
 1871: no race
 1872: Alaric
 1873: Regane
 1874: Tabellion
 1875: Pensacola
 1876: Pensacola
 1877: Pensacola
 1878: Gladia
 1879: Porcelaine
 1880: Mademoiselle Mars
 1881: Feuille de Frene
 1882: Beausejour
 1883: Octave
 1884: Richelieu
 1885: Directrice
 1886: Feuillage
 1887: Oviedo
 1888: Frapotel
 1889: Lugano
 1890: Eclair
 1891: Reveille
 1892: Reveille
 1893: Hoche
 1894: Hoche
 1895: Soberano
 1896:
 1897: Double Tour
 1898: Valparaiso
 1899: Railleur
 1900: Avant Garde
 1901: Calapita
 1902: Zulma
 1903: Romulus
 1904:
 1905: Mandarin
 1906: Chanaan
 1907: Go to Bed
 1908: Syphon
 1909:
 1910: Fils du Vent
 1911: Racine
 1912: Gilles de Rai
 1913: Turlupin
 1914: Mont d'Or
 1915–18: no race
 1919: Setauket
 1920: Glorious
 1921: Phusla
 1922: Phusla
 1923: Epinard
 1924: Niceas
 1925: Faraway
 1926: Mackwiller
 1927: Titan
 1928: Songe
 1929: La Fayette
 1930: Baoule
 1931:
 1932: Lovelace
 1933: Quartz
 1934: Shining Tor
 1935: Renette
 1936: Limac
 1937: Limac
 1938:
 1939: Romeo
 1940: no race
 1941: Thread
 1942: Fine Art
 1943: Fine Art
 1944: Fine Art
 1945: Fine Art
 1946: Fine Art
 1947: Thiercelin
 1948: Solina
 1949: Boree
 1950: Skylarking
 1951: Sanguine
 1952: Luzon
 1953: Joshua
 1954: Kalpack
 1955: Dictaway
 1956: Palariva
 1957: Jini
 1958: Edellic
 1959: Edellic
 1960: Sly Pola
 1961: High Bulk
 1962: L'Épinay
 1963: L'Épinay
 1964: Texanita
 1965: Holborn
 1966: Yours
 1967: Farhana
 1968: Be Friendly / Klaizia
 1969: Rockcress
 1970: Balidar
 1971: Montgomery
 1972: Montgomery
 1973: Saulingo
 1974: Flirting Around
 1975: Realty
 1976: Kala Shikari
 1977: Madang
 1978: Polyponder
 1979: Sigy

See also
 List of French flat horse races

References
 France Galop / Racing Post:

 france-galop.com – A Brief History: Prix du Gros Chêne.
 galopp-sieger.de – Prix du Gros Chêne.
 horseracingintfed.com – International Federation of Horseracing Authorities – Prix du Gros-Chêne (2016).
 pedigreequery.com – Prix du Gros Chêne – Chantilly.

Open sprint category horse races
Chantilly Racecourse
Horse races in France
Recurring sporting events established in 1857
1857 establishments in France